Rezaabad (also Romanized as Reẕāābād) is a village in Fenderesk-e Jonubi Rural District, Fenderesk District, Ramian County, Golestan Province, Iran. At the 2006 census, its population was 2,441, in 560 families.

References 

Populated places in Ramian County